Staple Edge Halt railway station is a disused railway station opened by the Great Western Railway (GWR) on the former Bullo Pill Railway, later known as the GWR Forest of Dean Branch.

History

The Halt was located about 3 miles 15 chains from Newnham on a 1 in 71 gradient.

The station opened when the Passenger services were introduced on 3 August 1907 and served the cottages that were owned by H. Crawshay & Co., the staple edge brickworks and Eastern United Colliery.

The low platform was constructed from wood. A pagoda style building was provided from the outset.

A two-lever ground frame gave access to the sidings of Eastern United Colliery until 1912 when a new goods loop was provided on the west side of the single line.

The points and signals were worked from a new 21 lever signal box, containing a frame of 17 working levers and 4 spare.  The new facilities had been installed and were in use by December 1913.

The frame was later extended to 23 levers in the connection with the installation of the Cast House Sidings on the East side of the single line.

Services

References

Further reading

Disused railway stations in Gloucestershire
Former Great Western Railway stations
Railway stations in Great Britain opened in 1907
Railway stations in Great Britain closed in 1958